Beaulieu Palace House is a 13th-century house in Beaulieu, Hampshire, United Kingdom. Originally part of Beaulieu Abbey, the estate was bought in 1538 by Thomas Wriothesley, 1st Earl of Southampton, following the Dissolution of the Monasteries. It is still owned and occupied by the earl's descendants, the Barons Montagu of Beaulieu.

History

Beaulieu Palace House was originally built in the 13th century as the gatehouse of Beaulieu Abbey. Following the Dissolution of the Monasteries, the estate was purchased by  Sir Thomas Wriothesley, later 1st Earl of Southampton, in  1538. The house passed through marriage into the Montagu family and is still owned by the 1st Earl's descendant, the 4th Baron Montagu of Beaulieu.

The house was extended in the 16th century, and again in the 19th century, and is today a fine example of a Gothic country house. The house overlooks Beaulieu River and is surrounded by lawns and walkways. The inside of the house has been kept in a Victorian style.

King James stayed at Beaulieu in August 1613 and gave an audience to the Venetian ambassador Antonio Foscarini.

Although still home to the current Lord and Lady Montagu, parts of the house and gardens are open daily to the public. It is a member of the Treasure Houses of England consortium.

The Palace House is open to the public as part of the visitor attraction known as "Beaulieu", which includes:

 Beaulieu Abbey
 National Motor Museum
 Beaulieu Palace House
 World of Top Gear
 Secret Army Exhibition - an exhibit about the Special Operations Executive training at Beaulieu during World War II
 Gardens
 A monorail
 Rides

In film

The 1936 British Pathé film, 'Miniature Railway', (ID Number 1222.23), is a 1':40" long feature which shows (Miss.) "Mary Cook" driving the engine around the grounds.

Local folklore and legend
Beaulieu, according to the official website, is one of the most haunted places in Britain, with reported sightings going back over a hundred years, and possibly as far as the mid-16th century. Numerous paranormal investigators have conducted research at the abbey, including Arthur Conan Doyle, who it is claimed made contact with a ghost during a séance at Palace House.

A lady in blue or grey, reportedly sighted walking through walls and making a lot of noise in the private apartments, is believed to be the ghost of the Countess of Beaulieu, Lady Isabella, who died in 1786. The smell of incense, which allegedly signals tragedy for the people of the abbey or the village, was also reported by Edward Douglas-Scott-Montagu, 3rd Baron Montagu of Beaulieu among others in a room of the Palace House used as a chapel in the Middle Ages.

References

External links
Official website

Buildings and structures completed in the 13th century
Country houses in Hampshire
Palaces in England
Historic house museums in Hampshire
Grade I listed buildings in Hampshire
Grade I listed palaces
New Forest folklore
Reportedly haunted locations in South East England